Glinka, also known as Kharchetoy is a village (selo) in the west of Khiloksky District of Zabaykalsky Krai, located on the right bank of the Khilok River.  Population: 421 (2002); 175 (1926).  The majority of the population is employed in the railway industry and in agriculture.

The settlement was founded in the winter of 1895-1896 as a place for rail workers to live.  In the decades to follow the railway station of Kharchetoy, a brick works, a windmill, a bakery, and two kolkhozes were built here.

References
The Encyclopedia of Trans-Baikal.  Entry on Glinka.

Rural localities in Zabaykalsky Krai